Alexander: The Other Side of Dawn is a 1977 American made-for-television drama film directed by John Erman, and a sequel to Dawn: Portrait of a Teenage Runaway (1976). It premiered on NBC on May 16, 1977.

Plot 

After the climatic ending in the first movie, Alexander Duncan (Leigh McCloskey), is taken to a hospital where he is being operated on. He has flashbacks of his life, showing how he came to Hollywood as an inexperienced young man from rural Oklahoma.

He spends most of his time drawing instead of being a farmhand to his father, this causes his father to basically throw Alex out of the home; his reasoning being that as the oldest Alex needs to become a man and make it on his own now, and with six other people to feed, they just can't afford for Alex to be another extra mouth. His father is firm on this, and his mother is not able to change the decision. Alex packs a small bag and with whatever money he has, buys a bus ticket to Hollywood, California.

At the bus depot, a streetwise hustler named Buddy befriends him. Buddy takes Alex back to his apartment and lets him stay there for the night. The next day, Alex tries to find a job, but because of California's strict labor laws, he doesn't have any luck because he is still a minor. Alex sees male prostitutes hustling on the streets as a means of income, and becomes disheartened when he returns to Buddy's apartment and sees an older man walking out the door. Buddy gives him a realistic talk about survival, and convinces Alex to go to a client of his to make an easy $50.

Alex's flashbacks ends and he is in the present day. He awakens in the hospital to Dawn, and they reaffirm their love to each other. Dawn helps Alex as much as she can after he's discharged from the hospital and still recovering. Both are no longer hustling, and without money, Alex convinces Dawn to go back home to her small Arizona town to wait for him to come get her. He takes her to the bus depot to see her off, promising her that he'll come get her when he earns enough money.

He loses the job that Umber got him in the first movie as a stock boy in a department store because of his involvement with Swan, and is unable to get another legit job afterwards because of his previous prostitution recognition. He calls home and speaks with his mother, telling her he wants to come home, but his mother says no. Alex is desperate and frustrated, and resorts back to prostitution, getting picked up by an undercover police officer immediately.

At the police station while he's getting booked, he asks to contact Donald Umber, and is overheard by a psychologist named Ray Church. Alex gets released on Ray signing for him, vouching for his guaranteed court appearance. Ray tells Alex that Umber is no longer around town, but that he's a good friend of his, and asks Alex how he knows him. Alex says that Umber helped him and Dawn before. Ray takes Alex to a youth house for gay men, but Alex feels uncomfortable because he is not gay, and he leaves immediately after he gets there.

Returning to his apartment, the landlady tells him the rent is way overdue, and the mural that he had painted on one side of the wall is being covered over with a coat of fresh wall paint. In Arizona, Dawn isn't adjusting well to being back home, and longs to be with Alex again. While on his way to the post office, Buddy sees him on the streets and catches up with him. He convinces Alex to go on a double date with him and one of his clients and her friend.

They go to a nice restaurant and Buddy lends Alex a nice suit to wear. They enjoy good food and wine, and Alex opens up to his older date about Dawn. He begins to enjoy himself, and he starts to genuinely like his date, going back to her home for the night. In the morning she gives him cab money, and he gets upset that she viewed their night together as a transaction. He does not take her cab money, and finds out that she has a husband as well as paid Buddy for their date. Alex goes to Buddy's apartment and confronts him about it; he leaves Buddy's apartment for the second time after feeling disgusted with the whole situation. Since he's been evicted, and not wanting to stay at Buddy's, he ends up sleeping outside underneath a public playground.

The next day, he is loitering at an art museum and is noticed by a man named Charles Selby, who is a professional football player. Selby is a closeted gay, and he entices Alex with his lavish lifestyle, employing Alex as his current boy-toy. He's making good money under Selby's employment and companionship, but Selby is not naive to Alex's true intentions and feelings.

Selby and Alex run into Ray at a nightclub, and Ray reminds him of his court appearance. At court, Alex gets lucky and goes before a compassionate judge who dismisses his charges with a warning not to appear before her in court again. Ray also gives Alex some advice, stating that Selby is smart enough to realize that Alex is just using him, and that he should be prepared for when Selby replaces him.

When Alex goes back to Selby's home from court, he sees that Ray's warning has come true. Selby is enticing a new boy-toy with the same surfer posing photographs that he did with Alex. At a party that Selby is hosting, the realization that Selby is getting tired of Alex becomes more prominent. Ray tells Alex that he needs to start thinking about his own life; that he has no cause to be bothered by the new surfer boy because Alex was just hustling Selby anyway. He also states that whatever Selby might be as a closeted gay, he's not a hustler.

After dropping off Ray, Alex goes on a drug pickup for Selby, but the whole party gets caught when two stakeout detectives follow Alex back to Selby's. In Arizona, while buying a shirt for Alex, a man recognizes Dawn as a prostitute in Hollywood. Dawn runs out of the store mortified. In court, Alex tells the judge that he just wants to leave and get out of that town forever; the same judge that dismissed his charges the first time, is sympathetic to him again, and dismisses his charges again.

Ray drops Alex off at the bus depot, where he's bought a ticket to Arizona to get Dawn. As he's on the bus, he sees Dawn in the streets. He gets off of his bus and runs up to Dawn, telling her that he was on the bus coming to get her, and she should have waited for him at home. She told him about the incident at the store with being recognized by a former john, and that she just couldn't wait anymore.

The movie ends with Alex telling Dawn that they're going to a new place and will try their luck there. As they head back to the bus depot to decide where they want to go, they see a fresh new kid walking out of the depot down Hollywood Blvd. for the first time. They both look at the young kid, knowing the hardships he'll be faced with.

Cast 
 Leigh McCloskey as  Alexander Duncan
 Eve Plumb as  Dawn Wetherby
 Juliet Mills as  Myra
 Jean Hagen as  Landlady
 Lonny Chapman as  Eddie Duncan
 Earl Holliman as  Ray Church
 Alan Feinstein as  Charles Selby
 Asher Brauner as  Buddy
 Diana Douglas as  Clara Duncan
 Pat Corley   as Marty
 Frances Faye as herself
 Alice Hirson as Judge White
 Jonathan Banks as Michael
 Fred Sadoff as Mr. Anderson
 Doria Cook-Nelson as Della

Alexander was the last appearance by actress Jean Hagen, who died August 29, 1977.

Reception 
Phil Hall of Film Threat called it "not a great film" but "a breakthrough, of sorts, in LGBT television."

References

External links 
 

1977 drama films
1977 television films
1977 films
1977 LGBT-related films
American sequel films
American teen LGBT-related films
NBC network original films
Films about prostitution in the United States
Films directed by John Erman
Films scored by Fred Karlin
Films set in Los Angeles
Gay-related films
LGBT-related drama films
Television sequel films
1970s English-language films
American drama television films
1970s American films